Redline Coaches was Tasmania's largest coach operator. It operated both route and charter services. As of late 2022, Redline coaches has changed its name as part of a business re-brand by the parent company, Kinetic, and has now been dissolved into the Kinetic brand with its fleet of buses reflecting this change.

History
Redline Coaches and the Larissey family business dates back to 1929 when Percy and Stella Larissey commenced trading as bus operators in Cressy Tasmania. 2. They were later joined by Percy's son Francis (Frank) to become P. Larissey & Son.
The current company, Redline Coaches, was formed in July 1963 when Frank Larissey purchased Sutton's Motor Service, Launceston with four buses and renamed it Redline Coaches.

In January 1965 Redline Coaches began operating ten-day tours of Tasmania connecting with the Empress of Australia at Bell Bay under contract to the Tasmanian Government Travel Bureau. Through a number of takeovers, Redline developed a network of services in north-east Tasmania. In 1975 the business of Young's Coaches was purchased and a contract picked up from Gippsland Educational Tours saw it conduct tours throughout mainland Australia. By this stage the fleet consisted of 19 vehicles. Further expansion came with it being appointed as a sub-contractor for AAT Kings, Ansett Pioneer and Australian Pacific Tours.

In May 1980 with Frank's son Michael now a part of the business Redline purchased the business of Tasmanian Coach Lines who operated stage services throughout the state. The sale included 17 vehicles. The combined operation was renamed Tasmanian Redline Coaches. In the next few years many other long-distance operators would be taken over with the fleet growing to 110 by 1992. Following the withdrawal of services by Ansett and TAA in 1982, Tasmanian Redline commenced airport services in Hobart and Launceston.

Tasmanian Redline also operated a freight business using a combination of luggage space on its coach services and dedicated vans. In September 1990 the long-distance market was deregulated and Hobart Coaches began competing on some of Tasmanian Redline's more profitable routes.

In 2009 Redline acquired the business of Smith's City to Surf Coaches servicing the Dodges Ferry region.

Redline was acquired by Kinetic Group in 2021, with the takeover announced in April 2021.

In late 2022, Redline was officially branded as KINETIC with all new advertising now showing the Kinetic Brand. All new buses will display the Kinetic logo with the current fleet slowly being updated to reflect the new brand name.

Fleet
As at November 2022, the fleet consisted of 81 buses and coaches.

References

* 
* 
*

External links
Company website

Bus companies of Tasmania
Kinetic Group companies
Australian companies established in 1963